"Summer Is Over" is a song by British YouTuber and rapper KSI. The song was written alongside Andrew "BullySongs" Bullimore, Dan Priddy, James Bell, Mams Taylor and produced by Dan Priddy & Digital Farm Animals. "Summer Is Over" was released for digital download and streaming by Warner Music Group, Beerus Limited, and Atlantic Records on 30 September 2022. A remix of the song was released 3 October 2022 by British producer Joel Corry.

"Summer Is Over" debuted at number 24 on the UK Singles Chart, becoming KSI's seventeenth top 40 hit.

Music and lyrics 
Speaking about "Summer Is Over" ahead of its release, KSI said, "This song is so personal to me. I can't lie, I've cried several times making and listening to it. I made this song at a really painful time in my life where mentally and physically I was struggling a lot. As someone in the public, I tend to have to hide my sad moments, so I normally use music therapeutically to help me get through those times. So yeah, this song means a lot to me, and has taken a lot for me to finally put out."

Music video 
The music video was directed by Troy Roscoe and was released to KSI's YouTube channel on 3 October 2022.

Track listing

Credits and personnel 
Credits adapted from Tidal.

 Digital Farm Animals – producer, composer, keyboards
 Dan Priddy – producer, composer, programmer, backing vocals, bass, drums, guitar, keyboards
 KSI – vocals, composer
 Mams Taylor - composer
 Lewis Hopkins - masterer
 Manny Marroquin - mixer

Charts

Release history

References 

2022 songs
2022 singles
KSI songs
Songs written by KSI
Songs written by Digital Farm Animals
Songs written by Andrew Bullimore
Song recordings produced by Digital Farm Animals
Atlantic Records singles
Warner Music Group singles